Lavender MRT station is an underground Mass Rapid Transit (MRT) station on the East West line in Kallang, Singapore. Located under Kallang Road, the station is close to the Immigration and Checkpoints Authority (ICA) Building, Golden Mile Complex and Jalan Besar Stadium. Planned and built as part of Phase Two of the original MRT network, the contract for the station's construction was awarded in October 1985, and it was opened in November 1989.

History
Planned as part of Phase Two of the original MRT network, the contract for the construction of Lavender station, as well as for Victoria station and the tunnels between Bras Basah Road and the Kallang River, was awarded to Nishimatsu/Lum Chang Joint Venture for S$227.1 million in October 1985. During the station's construction, between 1986 and 1989, the stretch of Kallang Road between Lavender Street and Rochor Canal Road was closed to traffic, and the station opened on 4 November 1989, along with the section of the East West line from City Hall to Tanah Merah.

Station details
Lavender station is located under Kallang Road, and is close to Golden Mile Complex, the ICA Building, and Jalan Besar Stadium. Served by the East West Line, between Kallang and Bugis stations, the station has the station code EW11.

References

External links

 

Railway stations in Singapore opened in 1989
Kallang
Mass Rapid Transit (Singapore) stations